Ambroise Gboho (born 6 August 1994) is an Ivorian professional footballer who plays as a forward for French  club Concarneau.

Career
While playing for Les Herbiers, Gboho scored the club's second goal in a 2–0 win over Chambly in the Coupe de France semi-finals. They eventually lost to Ligue 1 winners Paris Saint-Germain in the final.

In June 2018, Gboho joined Belgian First Division B club Westerlo. On 19 July 2021, he signed with Chambly in France.

On 26 January 2022, Gboho moved to Laval until the end of the season, with an option for an additional year.

Personal life
Gboho is the uncle of the French youth international footballer, Yann Gboho.

Honours 
Les Herbiers

 Coupe de France runner-up: 2017–18

Laval

 Championnat National: 2021–22

References

1994 births
Living people
Ivorian footballers
French sportspeople of Ivorian descent
Association football forwards
FC Chauray players
Stade Rennais F.C. players
SAS Épinal players
Les Herbiers VF players
K.V.C. Westerlo players
FC Chambly Oise players
Stade Lavallois players
US Concarneau players
Championnat National players
Championnat National 3 players
Challenger Pro League players
Ivorian expatriate footballers
Expatriate footballers in France
Expatriate footballers in Belgium
Ivorian expatriate sportspeople in Belgium
Ivorian expatriate sportspeople in France
People from Man, Ivory Coast